The 2015 Cotton Bowl Classic was a college football bowl game played on December 31, 2015 at AT&T Stadium in Arlington, Texas. The 80th Cotton Bowl Classic was a College Football Playoff semifinal between Alabama and Michigan State with the winner to compete in the 2016 College Football Playoff National Championship. It was one of the 2015–16 bowl games that concluded the 2015 FBS football season.

The game was broadcast on ESPN, ESPN Deportes, ESPN Radio and XM Satellite Radio. It was sponsored by the Goodyear Tire and Rubber Company and was officially known as the College Football Playoff Semifinal at the Goodyear Cotton Bowl Classic.

Alabama defeated Michigan State 38–0 and later won the National Championship by defeating Clemson in the National Championship game.

Teams
The Cotton Bowl acted as one of the two College Football Playoff semifinal games. The two teams selected for the game were No. 2 Alabama and No. 3 Michigan State. Michigan State returned to the Cotton Bowl after defeating Baylor in a non-playoff version of the bowl game on January 1, 2015. Michigan State became just the third school in history to play in the same bowl twice in a calendar year, joining Auburn, which played in the Gator Bowl on January 1 and December 31, 1954, and Oklahoma, which played in the Sugar Bowl on January 1 and December 31, 1972.

The game was a rematch of the 2011 Capital One Bowl, where Alabama defeated Michigan State 49–7.

Game summary
After Oklahoma lost to Clemson 17–37 in the Orange Bowl Semifinal, Michigan State was throttled by Alabama 38–0. A tight first half saw Alabama take a 10–0 lead into half time. Near the end of the second quarter, Michigan State had its best drive of the night, but all-time winningest MSU quarterback, Connor Cook, was intercepted by Cyrus Jones. Alabama scored a touchdown on the opening possession of the second half and MSU turned the ball over on its first possession. Alabama could not capitalize on the turnover, but did return MSU's next punt for a touchdown, putting the game out of reach at 24–0 with a little over three minutes remaining in the third quarter. MSU's offense could not muster any points and were held to a total of 249 yards. Cook finished the night with zero touchdowns and two interceptions.

Alabama would go on to defeat Clemson 45–40 for the 2016 College Football Playoff National Championship.

Scoring summary

Statistics

References

2015–16 NCAA football bowl games
2015–16 College Football Playoff
Cotton Bowl Classic
2015
2015
Cotton Bowl Classic
21st century in Arlington, Texas
December 2015 sports events in the United States